Barringtonia conoidea is a plant in the family Lecythidaceae.

Description

Distribution and habitat
Barringtonia conoidea is native to Myanmar, Vietnam, Singapore, Peninsular Malaysia, Sumatra and Borneo. Its habitat is mangrove forest and along rivers.

References

conoidea
Flora of Myanmar
Flora of Vietnam
Flora of Sumatra
Flora of Malaya
Flora of Borneo
Plants described in 1854